Pileus may refer to:

Pileus (hat), a brimless cap
Pileus (mycology), the "cap" of a mushroom
Pileus (meteorology), a cloud formation
the crown of a bird's head
the scales on the top of lizard and snake heads

See also

Jewish hat, pileus cornutus